The men's coxed four event was part of the rowing programme at the 1920 Summer Olympics. The competition was held on 28 and 29 August 1920. It was the third appearance of the event, which had previously been held inaugural rowing competitions in 1900 as well as in 1912. Eight boats (40 competitors), each from a different nation, competed. The medals all went to nations that had not won a medal in the men's coxed four previously: Switzerland and the United States took gold and silver, respectively, in their debuts in the event; Norway took bronze.

Background

This was the third appearance of the event. Rowing had been on the programme in 1896 but was cancelled due to bad weather. The coxed four was one of the four initial events introduced in 1900. It was not held in 1904 or 1908, but was held at every Games from 1912 to 1992 when it (along with the men's coxed pair) was replaced with the men's lightweight double sculls and men's lightweight coxless four.

The top nations in the coxed four coming into the Games included Switzerland (1920 European champions), France (1919 Inter-Allied champions), and Canada. France did not compete in the event at the Olympics, however, and Canada's team boat did not make it to Antwerp.

Brazil, Canada, Czechoslovakia, Switzerland, and the United States each made their debut in the event. Belgium, Norway, and Sweden competed for the second time, matching the absent France and Germany for a five-way tie for most among nations to that point.

Competition format

The coxed four event featured five-person boats, with four rowers and a coxswain. It was a sweep rowing event, with the rowers each having one oar (and thus each rowing on one side). The competition used the 2000 metres distance that became standard at the 1912 Olympics and which has been used ever since except at the 1948 Games.

The tournament featured two rounds of competition, with no repechages. The semifinals had three heats, with 2 or 3 boats in each heat. The winner of each semifinal advanced to the final, with all other boats eliminated. There was a single final, with three boats, to determine the medals.

Schedule

Results

Semifinals

Semifinal 1

The first heat featured the two top teams: Switzerland and Canada. The Canadian team had to use a borrowed boat when their own did not arrive in Antwerp. One of the riggers cracked immediately before the race started; the team managed to get into the lead anyway. However, the other shoulder of the rigger failed during the race and Canada had to row with only three oars for the remainder of the race.

Semifinal 2

Semifinal 3

Final

References

Sources
 
 

Rowing at the 1920 Summer Olympics